Burton "Buzzy" Kerbox is an American surfer, photographer and model. He is best known for co-developing tow-in surfing with Laird Hamilton, Dave Kalama and a handful of other surfers in the mid-1990s.

Early life
Kerbox was born in 1956 in Indianapolis, Indiana. His family moved to Kailua, in eastern Oahu, in 1965.

Surfing renown
Shortly after having moved to Hawaii, in 1966, Kerbox began surfing. He was ranked in the top ten in 1977, 1978 and 1980. He won the 1978 World Cup at Sunset Beach and the 1980 Surfabout in Sydney. His development of tow-in surfing, along with fellow surfers Dave Kalama, Laird Hamilton and others, paved the way for surfers worldwide to catch waves which were previously thought to be out of reach, either because they were far from natural breaks like beaches and coasts or because they were too big. The first few tow-in sessions were done using Kerbox's 15-foot Zodiac motorboat. In more recent years, Kerbox has been an advocate for standup paddle boarding, also known as SUP.

Tow-in surfing
Surfers are towed out to a breaking wave via a PWC (personal watercraft, such as a Jet Ski) or a helicopter. The surfer holds a line attached to the motorized vehicle. He or she is then set into place, at which point he or she drops the line and surfs the wave. Prior to the development of the tow-in method, surfers were generally unable, on their own, to catch waves topping much more than 20'. With the advent of the tow-in method, surfers were able to catch waves two and three times that height, or even taller. Driver and surfer generally trade roles during a surfing session, which helps to build both rapport and trust in a situation which can quickly turn dangerous for both. Tow-in is generally thought to have revolutionized big wave surfing. Kerbox and other professional surfers were featured in Susan Casey's 2011 non-fiction volume The Wave.

Modeling career
In 1977, famed photographer Bruce Weber saw a photograph of Kerbox in a surfing magazine and persuaded him to come to New York City to try his hand at modeling. Kerbox subsequently modeled in major national advertising campaigns for Levi's, Ralph Lauren and United Airlines.

Personal
Kerbox has three sons.

References

External links
 Encyclopedia of Surfing
 Official website
 The Wave: In Pursuit of the Rogues, Freaks, and Giants of the Ocean
 

1956 births
Artists from Indianapolis
American surfers
Male models from Indiana
American photographers
Living people